The People's Union, formerly known as the Party of National Revival "People's Will", was a Russian nationalist political party founded in December 2001. It was led by veteran Russian nationalist politician Sergey Baburin. In December 2008, it finished its existence as a political party and was reorganized into the Russian All-People's Union.

The Party of National Revival was created by uniting four minor Russian nationalist parties who merged, and its name Narodnaya Volya translates from Russian as People's Will. In September 2003, Narodnaya Volya joined Rodina and performed surprisingly well in the 2003 Russian legislative election. Narodnaya Volya was seen by many as the most nationalist and conservative element in a then-mostly leftist Rodina, and a number of its members in the past were associated with Russian far-right movements. Nine members of Narodnaya Volya were deputies of the Russian Duma. In October 2006, Narodnaya Volya, unlike most of Rodina, did not join the Russia of Justice party, and remained an independent faction in the Duma.

Narodnaya Volya stated to have international ties with the People's Opposition Bloc of Natalia Vitrenko led by Nataliya Vitrenko, the National Front led by Jean-Marie Le Pen, and the Serbian Radical Party of Vojislav Šešelj. Prominent Narodnaya Volya party members include Viktors Alksnis, Nikolai Leonov, and Aleksandr Rutskoy. In November 2006, the party gained prominence as one of the main organizers of the nationalist Russian Marsh during the Unity Day celebrations in Moscow.

On 26 March 2007, Narodnaya Volya united with 13 small nationalist, Orthodox Christian, and conservative organizations and party was renamed the People's Union. The new party declared its intention to participate in 2007 Russian legislative election. Among more prominent politicians who united under the leadership of Baburin was Anna Markova, former vice governor of Saint Petersburg. The party was not be able to take part in the 2007 legislative election, and decided to endorse the Communist Party of Russian Federation.

Parliamentary elections

See also 
 List of political parties in Russia
 Russian All-People's Union (1991–2001, 2008–)

References

External links 
 Official website (in Russian)

2001 establishments in Russia
2008 disestablishments in Russia
Conservative parties in Russia
Defunct conservative parties
Defunct nationalist parties in Russia
National conservative parties
Political parties disestablished in 2008
Political parties established in 2001
Russian nationalist parties
Social conservative parties